Reginald Harold Haslam "Tim" Parnell (25 June 1932 – 5 April 2017) was a British racing driver from England. He participated in four Formula One World Championship Grands Prix, debuting on 18 July 1959, and qualified for two of them. He scored no championship points. His only finish was tenth place in the 1961 Italian Grand Prix at Monza. Parnell managed the BRM Formula One team from 1970–74, and was the son of Reg Parnell, another racing driver and team principal.
After his father's death in 1964, he took on the running of Reg Parnell Racing and on occasion managed his own team with entries for Mike Spence and Pedro Rodriguez.

Parnell died on 5 April 2017 at the age of 84.

Complete Formula One World Championship results
(key)

References

English racing drivers
English Formula One drivers
Formula One team owners
Formula One team principals
Reg Parnell Racing Formula One drivers
1932 births
2017 deaths